Aksaray District (also: Merkez, meaning "central") is a district of Aksaray Province of Turkey. Its seat is the city Aksaray. Its area is 3,540 km2, and its population is 315,222 (2021).

Composition
There are 9 municipalities in Aksaray District:

 Aksaray
 Bağlıkaya
 Helvadere
 Sağlık
 Taşpınar
 Topakkaya
 Yenikent
 Yeşilova
 Yeşiltepe

There are 83 villages in Aksaray District:

 Acıpınar
 Ağzıkarahan
 Akçakent
 Akhisar
 Akin
 Alayhanı
 Altınkaya
 Armutlu
 Ataköy
 Babakonağı
 Bağlı
 Bayındır
 Baymış
 Bebek
 Borucu
 Bostanlık
 Boyalı
 Bozcatepe
 Büyükgüve
 Büyükpörnekler
 Çağlayan
 Cankıllı
 Çavdarlılar
 Çekiçler
 Çeltek
 Ceran
 Cerit
 Çimeliyeni
 Çolaknebi
 Darıhüyük
 Dikmen
 Doğantarla
 Ekecikgödeler
 Ekeciktol
 Ekecikyeni
 Elmacık
 Fatmauşağı
 Gençosman
 Gökçe
 Göksügüzel
 Gözlükuyu
 Gücünkaya
 Gültepe
 Hanobası
 Hatipoğlutolu
 Hırkatolu
 İncesu
 İsmailağatolu
 Kalebalta
 Karacaören
 Karaçayır
 Karakova
 Karakuyu
 Karaören
 Karataş
 Karkın
 Kazıcık
 Koçpınar
 Koyak
 Kutlu
 Küçükgüve
 Küçükpörnekler
 Macarlı
 Nurgöz
 Salmanlı
 Sapmaz
 Sarayhan
 Sarıağıl
 Seleciköse
 Sevinçli
 Şeyhler
 Susadı
 Taptukemre
 Tatlıca
 Ulukışla
 Ulukışlatolu
 Yağan
 Yalman
 Yalnızceviz
 Yanyurt
 Yapılcan
 Yenipınar
 Yuva

References

Districts of Aksaray Province